The Jincheng–Xinxiang Expressway, commonly referred to as the Jinxin Expressway is an expressway that connects Jincheng, Shanxi, China, and Xinxiang, Henan. The expressway is a spur of G55 Erenhot–Guangzhou Expressway.

References

Chinese national-level expressways
Expressways in Shanxi
Expressways in Henan